Rutki-Kossaki  is a village in Zambrów County koszary, Podlaskie Voivodeship, in north-eastern Poland. It is the seat of the gmina (administrative district) called Gmina Rutki.

The village has a population of 1,300.

References

Rutki-Kossaki
Łomża Governorate
Białystok Voivodeship (1919–1939)
Warsaw Voivodeship (1919–1939)
Belastok Region